Legionella birminghamensis is a Gram-negative, non-spore-forming, aerobic bacterium from the genus Legionella, which was isolated from a cardiac transplant recipient and from water near Clermont-Ferrand in France. It was named after Birmingham, Alabama.

References

External links
Type strain of Legionella birminghamensis at BacDive -  the Bacterial Diversity Metadatabase

Legionellales
Bacteria described in 1988